Hatfield College is one of the constituent colleges of Durham University in England. It occupies a city centre site above the River Wear on the World Heritage Site peninsula, lying adjacent to North Bailey and only a short distance from Durham Cathedral. Taking its name from a medieval Prince-Bishop of Durham, the college was founded in 1846 as Bishop Hatfield's Hall by David Melville, a former Oxford don.

Melville disliked the 'rich living' of patrician undergraduates at University College, and hoped to nurture a collegiate experience that would be affordable to those of limited means; and in which the students and staff were to be regarded as part of a single community. In line with his ambitions, the college pioneered the concept of catered residences for students, where all meals were taken in the hall, and occupants charged fixed prices for board and lodgings — this system became the norm for Durham colleges, and later on at Oxford and Cambridge, before spreading worldwide.

As the 20th century progressed, Hatfield was increasingly characterised by its irreverent atmosphere among undergraduates, reputation for academic indifference, sporting achievement — especially in rugby — and possessing a high intake of students from English public schools. College administration, on the other hand, preferred to highlight the willingness of students to get involved in a wide variety of university activities; and argued that 'Hatfield man', contrary to his reactionary image, had often been at the forefront of significant reform on campus.

College architecture is an eclectic blend of buildings from a variety of styles and periods. The sloping main courtyard contains an eighteenth-century dining hall, the restrained Jacobethan Melville Building (designed by Anthony Salvin), a Victorian Gothic chapel, and the 'inoffensive neo-Georgian' C Stairs. The trend for revivalist and traditional buildings was disposed of with the modern Jevons Building, located in the college's second courtyard, which interprets older forms in a more 'contemporary' manner.

After many decades as a single-sex institution, the first female undergraduates were formally admitted in Michaelmas term 1988.

History

Early years
The establishment of the college in 1846 as a furnished and catered residence with set fees was a revolutionary idea, but later became the general standard for university accommodation in the modern sense: an "arrangement where students would be provided with furnished rooms and meals for a flat fee". Previously, university students were expected to furnish their rooms themselves. This concept came from the young founding master, David Melville, who believed his model would make a university education more affordable.  Essentially, the three principles were that rooms would be furnished and let out to students with shared servants, meals would be provided and eaten in the college hall, and college battels (bills) were set in advance. This system made Hatfield a more economical choice when compared to University College, whose students were generally wealthier, and ensured that student numbers at Hatfield built up steadily. Melville's model was introduced to the wider university after an endorsement from the Royal Commission of 1862.

Although not intended as a theological college, for the first 50 years the majority of students tended towards theology, while senior staff members and the principal were in holy orders. Under William Sanday (1876–1883) student numbers rose considerably, prompting a desperate search for extra rooms. It was forced to rent 3 South Bailey (now part of St John's College) in 1879 to accommodate them. Though Hatfield was run on the most economical lines, student poverty was a frequent problem. Dr Joseph Fowler, who, apart from his roles as Chaplain and Senior Tutor in the college, acted as Bursar, allowed undergraduates to take on some debt and even loaned them money, often employing rather creative accounting practises in the process. In 1880, a tennis court was installed for the first time, occupying roughly the same space as the current one. In the 1890s, the college purchased Bailey House and the Rectory (despite its name, most previous occupants were laymen) to accommodate more students. As the end of the century drew closer, the balance of undergraduate students rapidly shifted away from theology. In 1900, there were 49 arts students who had matriculated within the previous 3 years, and 20 in theology. By 1904, just 9 theology undergraduates are recorded, compared to 57 in arts.

Inter-war

The inter-war period saw a decline in college fortunes. In the first two decades of the 20th century,  Hatfield had experienced a sharp fall in numbers. This was caused initially by the decision to isolate science courses at the campus in Newcastle, an increased tendency to train priests at specialized colleges, poor finances, and finally the outbreak of the First World War. For 15 years after 1897, total students in residence numbered above 100. This had fallen to 69 in 1916, 2 in 1917, and to 3 in 1918. After the war finished there was a temporary leap to more than 60 undergraduates, but by 1923 there were just 14 men on the college books. In 1924, a new science department was established in Durham, and this, along with the active recruiting efforts of new Master Arthur Robinson (1923–1940), achieved gains in student numbers. Within five years of Robinson's appointment they had quintupled from the low of 1923.

However, the economic crisis of the 1920s created uncertainty. Hatfield had more students than University College yet lacked the facilities, especially kitchens, to accommodate them. University College, on the other hand, was comparatively undersubscribed. To address this, the two colleges effectively amalgamated under the guidance of Angus Macfarlane-Grieve, and all meals were taken together in the Great Hall of University College, while each college retained its own set of officers and clubs. Unhappy with this arrangement, some Hatfielders expressed their separate identity in trivial ways: for example, using a different door to enter the Castle dining hall than the University College students, and, in contrast to the University College contingent – turning to face the High Table during grace.

The political situation in Europe impacted college activities: during one memorable rag week in 1936, Hatfield students staged a mock Nazi procession to the nearby Market Square, with participants dressing in jackboots, brown shirts, and fascist armbands. One of them, Joe Crouch, a fluent German speaker, comically impersonated Adolf Hitler and delivered an impromptu speech to the assembled crowd. In 1938, fears of an impending war resulted in the construction of an air raid shelter, with dons and servants digging trenches in the Master's garden (now Dunham Court). Gas masks were issued to college residents. Meanwhile, a recent decline in the number of freshers, and the death that year of John Hall How, the Master of University College, gave rise to rumours that Hatfield would be annexed to its older neighbour.

World War II

In October 1939, Hatfielders were barred from their own college when the university decided to use Hatfield as a temporary site for the new Neville's Cross College, an institution for training women teachers. Having spent over a decade taking meals in Castle, they would now be prevented from using Hatfield buildings altogether. Without its own buildings and Master, and the issue of the ongoing war, Hatfield was in a poor position to recruit new students, an era later described as the "wilderness years" by college archivist Arthur Moyes.

However, the college received an unexpected new lease of life when the Royal Air Force established short courses at the university for some of its cadets, and soon these cadets made up half of the Hatfield student body. This led the university to postpone plans to merge Hatfield with University College. Plans were revived again in 1943, but met the strong opposition of Hatfield dons, especially Hedley Sparks. In 1946, the centenary year of the college, members formed the Hatfield Association to both represent alumni and demonstrate to the university council that Hatfield was supported.

Post-war

The university finally decided that from October 1949, Hatfield would be reestablished as an independent college – with Vindolanda archaeologist Eric Birley (1949–1956) appointed to serve as the new Master. The post-war period saw Hatfield once again faced with the familiar problem of squeezing in a larger student population, as the war had created a growing backlog.  More buildings were constructed and refurbished. Moreover, accommodation was acquired away from the main site and the Senior Common Room was established. In 1962, it was decided that a brass plaque should be fixed to the college gates identifying the establishment as Hatfield College. Just 24 hours after installation, a group of students from a rival Bailey college were caught trying to remove the plaque as a sporting trophy. In 1963, the college received its first taste of student protest, when a "militant minority group of young gentlemen united under the banner of International Socialism". Around the same time students voted to boycott formal dinners after a row with Master Thomas Whitworth (1957–1979) over whether or not jeans counted as formal wear.

Reforms were subsequently introduced. Joint standing committees, composed equally of staff and students, were set up to "deliberate almost every conceivable topic" and the undergraduate Senior Man was allowed to take part in meetings of the college's governing body. By 1971, a "liberal and balanced" Governing Body had been achieved: consisting of 4 college tutors, 4 elected tutors, 4 delegates from the Junior Common Room, and a representative from the Hatfield Association alumni group. Writing in the same year, a satisfied Whitworth was able to boast of warding off the "mischievous opportunism" of student "exhibitionists".

Modern

The leadership of James Barber (1980–1996) was a period of significant change. Student numbers rose, increasing to over 650 by the time Barber finished his tenure in office. Living out became compulsory for students for at least part of their career, and many existing buildings were either rebuilt or refurbished to make room for students: The Rectory was remodeled, C & D Stairs were refurbished, the Main Hall was repaired, and Jevons' was redecorated. A Middle Common Room for the postgraduate community was added in Kitchen Stairs. In 1981, the Formal Ball was renamed  'The Lion in Winter', which it has been called ever since. More comically, 'C Scales', a goldfish, was elected as a member of the JCR in 1982 and put forward as a potential Durham Student Union President. In 1984, the JCR was sued by representatives of the band Mud after a student ruined four speakers by pouring beer into an amplifier during a performance at a college ball.

Hatfield also became co-educational, which at the time was only 'grudgingly accepted' by the college. In 1985, talk of going mixed was stimulated by the low numbers of applicants selecting Hatfield as their preference, and a recent decline in academic standards – with the college finishing bottom of the results table the previous year. Despite threats of hooliganism, the Senior Common Room decided in May of that year to push forward with plans to go mixed. In March 1987, a student referendum was held, with 79.2% voting for the college to remain men only. The Senate decided that, despite the referendum result, the college would in fact go mixed – and the first female undergraduates arrived the following year. The first female Senior Man held the post in 1992. Her election win, by a single vote, prompted some students to declare a mock 'week of mourning' and walk around the college wearing black arm bands.

Buildings

Main Court

The oldest part of the college site is likely what is now the dining room, believed to date back to the 17th century. It originally formed part of a town house owned by a wealthy member of local society, and was converted in 1760 into a coaching inn, The Red Lion – a stopping point for coaches travelling between London and Edinburgh. During this time it also hosted concerts, probably featuring the work of composers like Charles Avison and John Garth. In 1799 the old coaching inn reverted to being a private residence. In 1845, it was sold to the university, and emerged as the first component of the newly founded Hatfield College the following year. Much more extensive when first occupied by Hatfield, since then "substantial parts of the building" have been replaced by newer structures. Apart from the dining room, what remains are spaces adjoining it that were once used by travellers, but are now filled by the Senior Common Room (SCR) – formerly a card room – the SCR dining room; and finally, on the higher floors, the 'D Stairs' student accommodation block, which comprises 13 twin rooms. D Staircase has had a reputation for being haunted by a female spirit, recognisable by the aroma of a distinctive perfume.

At the west end of the dining room is Kitchen Block, which features the main kitchens as well as a small number of student rooms and offices on the higher floors. 'C Stairs', holding the C accommodation block, was officially opened in 1932 by Lord Halifax. It replaced an earlier section of the coaching inn used since the founding of the college. Designed by Anthony Salvin, A & B Stairs – also used for undergraduate housing – was completed in 1849 at a cost of £4,000, and was the first purpose-built part of the college. Containing A and B accommodation blocks, it was renamed and rededicated as the Melville Building in 2005 after a £1million refurbishment. Author Josceline Dimbleby, the great-great-granddaughter of David Melville, was invited to perform the ceremony.

The Rectory was acquired in 1897, and is the administrative hub of the college, encompassing as it does the offices of the Master, the Vice-Master & Senior Tutor, the Assistant Senior Tutor, the Chaplain, the Senior Administrative Secretary, the Senior Tutor's Secretary, the Finance Officer and the Hatfield Trust/Association. The Birley Room, used for social functions, can be found at the ground floor of the Rectory. Added to the college at the same time as the Rectory, Hatfield Cottage is in between the redundant church of St Mary-le-Bow (now the Durham Museum and Heritage Centre) and Gatehouse Block. It is where the Middle Common Room (MCR) is now located, having moved from its former space in Kitchen Block.

Gatehouse Block is to the right of the entrance and houses the porters' lodge. It also has single and twin use student rooms. In 1961 the college had begun a project to replace the remnants of a much older gatehouse that was in poor condition. The new pseudo-Georgian replacement was completed by Easter 1962 for a total cost of £55,000. To provide an unbroken front to the North Bailey, decorative gates and railings were installed in the aftermath.

Dunham Court

Named after alumnus Kingsley Dunham, Dunham Court is the second quadrangle of the college. Accessed through an underpass by the chapel, it comprises two buildings, Jevons (Frank Jevons) and Pace (Edward Pace). An influx of extra students after the war stimulated demand for more accommodation and the garden of the old Jevon's House provided the available space. The new building, described by Pevsner as "friendly", with a "nice rhythm of windows towards the river", was finished in 1950 and named after former Vice-Master Edward Pace.

The college commenced the largest building project in its history when it demolished old Jevon's House, a "property of advanced decrepitude" once occupied by the bare-knuckle boxer and politician John Gully before its purchase by the university. As parts of the building had become dangerous by this point, the entire structure had to be removed. Construction of the new modernist style Jevons Building, which would complete the new Dunham Court, began in June 1966. It was officially unveiled in a ceremony in June 1968, attended by both Kingsley Dunham and Lord Lieutenant of Durham James Duff. It won a Civic Trust Award the following year. In 1972 a fishpond, since removed, was constructed in the centre of the court at the encouragement of senior college officers.

Both buildings contain rooms and social spaces: the college bar and café is located in Jevons, while Pace has a TV lounge, a music room, two gyms, and the JCR Common Room.

Chapel 

The college chapel was conceived in 1851 and built by 1854, funded by donations by alumni and topped up with a loan of £150 from the university. Designed by Bishop Cosin's Hall chaplain, James Turner (also a trained architect), it contains head sculptures of William Van Mildert, the founder of the university, and Warden Thorp, the first Vice-Chancellor.

Commemorative oak panels mark the fallen of the First World War, with a book of remembrance naming those lost in the Second World War.  The chapel houses a Harrison & Harrison organ, which is used to accompany services and for recitals. In 2001, it was refurbished at the cost of £65,000.

When Hatfield was founded, attendance at cathedral services was compulsory; and once the chapel was constructed attendance at these services was obligatory for the next 80 years. Since then, the chapel has been described as making up an "important but minority interest" within the college.

Hatfield offers eight choral scholarships annually, after an audition and interview process with the chaplain during first term. The choir is led by a student choral director, supported by an organ scholar and deputy organ scholar. It is mainly made up of students who support regular worship in the chapel, but also sing at other churches and cathedrals, with annual tours undertaken both at home and abroad. A further scholarship, the Matthew Fantom Organ Scholarship, is available to those students in the early stages of learning to play the organ and who would not be ready to apply for the regular organ scholarships.

Other buildings
Opposite the gatehouse on North Bailey is Bailey House, an accommodation block which provides 50 single rooms, plus a communal and kitchen area on the ground floor. Palmers Garth is located across the Kingsgate Bridge over the River Wear. It offers 8 twin and 41 single rooms for 57 students. The building was formerly used for administration by the university, and once hosted the careers service until it was handed over to Hatfield College in 1991.

The postgraduate accommodation site is James Barber House, or JBH for short, a self-catered residence on nearby Church Street. Named after former Master James Barber, it was completed by Durham County Council as Palatine House in 1968, and originally a care home for the elderly before its purchase by the college in 2006.

College traditions

Arms 

From its foundation, the college used as its arms the personal shield of Thomas Hatfield (Azure, a chevron or, between three lions rampant argent). The crest was made circular in design and was accompanied with the Latin motto "Vel Primus Vel Cum Primis", which literally means "Either First or With the First", though is now loosely interpreted by the college as "Be the Best you can Be".

In 1954, the college learned that its crest was unregistered with the College of Arms, and its display, including the use of Bishop Hatfield's shield, was both inappropriate and illegal. Consequently, it sought a grant of its own from the College of Arms, which was approved. The new arms were based on Hatfield's shield, but to difference the college's arms from the bishop's, a crown and plumes above the shield was added, with an ermine border and the college motto scrolled underneath.

This new crest was more "official" looking but tricky to reproduce. Rodney Lucas, a student in the 1950s, was asked to produce freehand drawings of the college arms (one with the crest and one without) for use in the annual Hatfield Record. The design without the crest was ultimately chosen and appeared for years on college stationary. In June 1994, Lucas contacted the college with a new rendering of the college arms made on a computer, which was subsequently adopted. The commercial design for the arms was changed once again in 2005.

Academic dress 
Similar to most Bailey Colleges, the wearing of the undergraduate academic gown is required for formal events, including to the matriculation ceremony and all formal dinners held in college.

Formals 
In Michaelmas term (first term), formal dinners are held twice each week, on Tuesday and Friday. Epiphany term (second term) sees this reduced to mainly Fridays, while few formals are held during Easter term (third term) as students' attention is increasingly focused on exams and assignments. A High table, consisting of senior staff, is also present during formal meals.

Unique to Hatfield is the tradition of 'spooning', in which students bang spoons on the edge of the table or on silverware for several minutes before the formal starts. The act immediately ceases when the High Table walks in.

Grace 

This can be translated as:

Blessed God, who feedest us from our youth, and providest food for all flesh, fill our hearts with joy and gladness, that we, having enough to satisfy us, may abound in every good work, through Jesus Christ our Lord, to whom with thee and the Holy Spirit, be all honour and praise and power for all ages. Amen.

Since 1846 the grace has been read at all formal meals in college. It is popular at alumni dinners, where an attempt to read the grace in English was badly received by guests.

Widely used in the fourth century and based on earlier Hebrew prayers, it was translated from the Greek and adopted by Oriel College, Oxford. Hatfield copied it practically verbatim; the college believes this was likely influenced by the Rev. Henry Jenkyns, a Fellow of Oriel before becoming Professor of Greek and Classical Literature at Durham.

Student body 
As of the 2017/18 academic year, Hatfield College has a population of 1,339 students. There are 1,007 full-time undergraduates and 3 part-time undergraduates. Postgraduate figures include 55 students on full-time postgraduate research programs and 111 studying for full-time postgraduate taught programs, plus a further 94 part-time postgraduate students (research and taught) as well as 69 distance learning students.

Common rooms 
The Junior Common Room (JCR) is for undergraduates in the college. It annually elects an executive committee consisting of 10 members, including an impartial chair, who run the JCR in conjunction with college officers. Unlike other colleges, Hatfield exclusively retains Senior Man as its title for the head of the JCR, having rejected a motion to move to "JCR President" in May 2014. A motion to allow the incumbent to choose between "Senior Man", "Senior Woman" or "Senior Student" was also defeated in January 2016.

The Middle Common Room (MCR) is the organisation for postgraduate students. Postgraduate accommodation is located at James Barber House. College officers, fellows and tutors are members of the Senior Common Room (SCR).

Image 

Having shed its theological image by the Second World War, Hatfield came to be seen in the decades following as a sporty college, with students who often held a relaxed attitude towards studying and were assumed to be disproportionately recruited from socially exclusive private schools. Writing in 1996, college archivist Arthur Moyes admitted that modesty "is not a Hatfield characteristic".

Portrayals of Hatfield students as more privileged than others were resisted by then Master Thomas Whitworth in his 1971 college history, Yellow Sandstone and Mellow Brick; instead, Whitworth defined Hatfielders by ambition, and stressed their tendency to seek leadership positions on campus. This viewpoint was echoed years later by his successor, James Barber:

Alumni have also praised a "work hard, play hard ethos" conducive to future success and highlighted a strong sense of identity and community. Nevertheless, student articles have criticised Hatfield for being 'rah', and suggested it is responsible for perpetuating negative views about the wider university.

Past data has shown it to be popular with applicants from private schools. For the 2015/2016 cycle, 65.8% of applicants were privately educated – against a university total of only 36.1%. To attract a wider range of candidates it has launched an outreach programme working with pupils in local state schools in Gateshead, Hartlepool, and Washington.

Admissions 
For the 2015/2016 entry cycle 1,375 applicants selected the college as their preference. This made it the 5th most popular overall, behind University College, Josephine Butler College, Collingwood College, and St Mary's College. 336 accepted applicants ultimately enrolled. Compared to most other colleges, Hatfield received a somewhat higher percentage of gap year applicants, with 7.8% of applicants in the 2015/2016 cycle choosing to defer, against a university average of 3.8%.

College officers and fellows

Master 

The current Master is Ann MacLarnon, Professor of Evolutionary Anthropology at Durham University, who assumed the role in September 2017.

List of past masters 
 David Melville (1846–1851)
 William Henderson (1851–1852)
 Edward Bradby (Michaelmas Term 1852)
 James Lonsdale (1853–1854)
 John Pedder (1854–1859)
 James Barmby (1859–1876)
 William Sanday (1876–1883)
 Archibald Robertson (1883–1897)
 Frank Jevons (1896–1923)
  Arthur Robinson (1923–1940)
 Angus Macfarlane-Grieve (1940–1949)
 Eric Birley (1949–1956)
 Thomas Whitworth (1957–1979)
 James Barber (1980–1996)
 Tim Burt (1996–2017)

Fellows 
Hatfield College Council awards honorary fellowships to alumni and people who have a close association with Hatfield. On receipt of the fellowship, the fellow automatically becomes an honorary member of the SCR and receives the same benefits. By 2012, honorary fellows numbered 24 in total, notably including former university chancellor Bill Bryson.

As of 2018, other staff affiliated to the college include eight junior research fellows and 10 Senior Research Fellows. Current senior fellows include, amongst others, the theologian Douglas Davies. The college also occasionally hosts visiting academics, normally for one term, as part of the fellowship scheme offered by the university's Institute of Advanced Study.

Sports and societies

Hatfield College Boat Club 

Hatfield College Boat Club (HCBC) is the boat club of Hatfield College at Durham University. The club was started in 1846, shortly after the founding of the college, making it one of the oldest student clubs in Durham. There is a Novice Development programme for absolute beginners. It also trains coxes and has a dedicated Coxes Captain.

The current college boathouse was completed in Epiphany term of 1881, with the previous structure having to be rebuilt and re-sited at the cost of £250 – club members believing it to be 'inconveniently small' and very exposed to flood damage. Up until 2001 Hatfield shared its boat club with rowers from Trevelyan College. Tension over space, resulting from Hatfield's desire to purchase additional boats, saw the termination of this arrangement, with Trevelyan later electing to store its boats with the local owner of a private boathouse.

In 2016, the boathouse was one of several to fall victim to racist graffiti and had a swastika and SS symbol splashed on the doors. Major maintenance was carried out in 2019: the roof was reinforced and the doors sanded and repainted.

Notable former members of the club include Alice Freeman, Louisa Reeve, Angus Groom, and Simon Barr.

Rugby 
Hatfield College has become known for prowess in rugby in particular – so much so that Thomas Whitworth (Master, 1957–79), a known rugby enthusiast, was often accused of bias in the selection and treatment of rugby-playing students. In intercollegiate rugby, Hatfield became the dominant club in the decades following the war, conceding the colleges cup just once in a 14-year period up to 1971. The Durham University team that triumphed in the 1969 University Athletic Union final against Newcastle University was made up mostly of Hatfield players.

Intercollegiate dominance continued into the 1970s, 1980s, and 1990s, with Hatfield eventually establishing a record of 30 cup wins in 32 years. The 1995 cup final was noteworthy for being an all-Hatfield event, contested by the college's A and B teams. Today, double protein portions for university rugby players are still offered in the college dining hall each meal-time.

Will Carling, Will Greenwood, and Marcus Rose are the most notable former undergraduates, all of whom made multiple appearances for England and participated in various editions of the Rugby World Cup. Richard Breakey and Jeremy Campbell-Lamerton were capped by Scotland, while Mark Griffin won several caps for the United States. Josh Basham, Stuart Legg and Ben Woods have all played club rugby for Newcastle Falcons. Another recent graduate, Fitz Harding, is signed to Bristol Bears.

Other sports and societies 
Hatfield has its own theatre group, the Lion Theatre Company. It has SHAPED, which is a personal development program.

Notable alumni 
Hatfield alumni are active through organisations and events, such as the Hatfield association, which now has a membership of more than 4,000 graduates.

Some Hatfielders with more idiosyncratic career paths defy straightforward categorisation and are not listed in the below sections. They include: an academic and United Nations official who married a Princess, a security consultant with ties to a mercenary coup attempt in Africa, a financially profligate serial school founder, and a pioneering clergyman ecologist.

The sporting alumni of Hatfield College may be the most famous, among them former England rugby union captain Will Carling, 2003 Rugby World Cup winner Will Greenwood, and former England cricket team captain Andrew Strauss. Fast bowler Frank Tyson and top order batsman Nick Compton and Tim Curtis are three other cricketing former students who made test match appearances for England. In rowing, Simon Barr, Alice Freeman, Angus Groom, Louisa Reeve, and Emily Taylor have all achieved success at international level. Athletes Jon Solly and Mark Hudspith medalled at the 1986 Commonwealth Games and 1994 Commonwealth Games respectively. Katharine Ford is the only Briton to ride an indoor velodrome for 12 hours or more.

Politicians and campaigners who have attended the college include Robert Buckland, a former Secretary of State for Justice and Lord Chancellor; Edward Timpson, the MP for Eddisbury and former Minister of State for Children and Families; and Labour Party life peer Baron Carter of Coles. From earlier generations of students, theology graduate and noted suffragist Claude Hinscliff, conducted the funeral service for Emily Davison; and Clifford Nelson Fyle, a 1960 English graduate, wrote the lyrics to the Sierra Leone National Anthem. More recently, Jolyon Maugham – a 1995 law graduate – is founding director of the Good Law Project.

Hatfielders in the military include Lord Dannatt, a former Chief of the General Staff, and one of his successors in the same role – General Mark Carleton-Smith. The late Air Marshall Peter Walker, Rear Admiral Andrew Burns, the current Fleet Commander, and retired Rear Admiral Matt Parr were also Hatfield undergraduates, in addition to Major-General Peter Grant Peterkin, who would go on to be appointed Serjeant at Arms in the House of Commons. Intelligence officer and conservationist Tracy Philipps, once a soldier amid numerous other activities, won the Military Cross during the First World War for his endeavours in the East African Campaign.

At least 5 alumni have held ambassadorial level posts in the Foreign Office. They include: Kim Darroch, previously British Ambassador to the United States; former High Commissioner to Jamaica David Fitton; former High Commissioner to Bangladesh David Carter; Bruce Bucknell, a former British Ambassador to Belarus; and William Quantrill, who served as Ambassador to Cameroon. Peter Waterworth, an ex-Senior Man, was Governor of Montserrat from 2007 to 2011.

In the media, broadcaster Jeremy Vine; presenters Mark Durden-Smith, Jonathan Gould, and Mark Pougatch; and David Shukman, Science Editor of BBC News (2012–2021), were all students at the college. Travel writer Alexander Frater was a Hatfield student, as was the poet and memoirist Thomas Blackburn, the fashion journalist Colin McDowell, singer-songwriter Jake Thackray, and comedian Ed Gamble. Landowner Delaval Astley, the 23rd Baron Hastings, played Cameron Fraser in The Archers for a number of years. Ecclesiastical alumni are numerous: with former Bishop of Derby Peter Dawes, former Bishop of Cyprus and the Gulf Clive Handford, royal chaplain Francis ffolkes, 5th Baronet, and Morris Gelsthorpe, the first Bishop in the Sudan, making up just a small sample.

In academia, names include computer scientist Keith Clark, Professor of Computational Logic at Imperial College London (1987–2009); particle physicist Nigel Glover, a current professor at Durham; Rebecca Goss, Professor of Organic Chemistry at the University of St Andrews; and economists Philip Booth, of the Institute of Economic Affairs, and Gordon Cameron, Professor of Land Economy at the University of Cambridge (1980–1990) and Master of Fitzwilliam College, Cambridge (1988–1990); while glaciologist David Vaughan and geologist Joanne Johnson have both conducted research for the British Antarctic Survey. Investment manager Richard Pease, 4th Baronet, Eden Project founder Tim Smit, BP executive Richard Paniguian, telecoms entrepreneur Peter Owen Edmunds, Oliver Bonas founder Oliver Tress, and David Arkless, Chairman of End Human Trafficking Now, are all examples of alumni with a background in the business world.

Gallery

See also
 List of Hatfield College alumni with articles on Wikipedia
 History of Durham University

Notes

References

Bibliography

Citations

External links 

 Hatfield College
 Junior Common Room
 Middle Common Room
 Senior Common Room

 
Educational institutions established in 1846
1846 establishments in England
Grade II listed buildings in County Durham
Grade II listed educational buildings
Colleges of Durham University